Samarth Vyas (born 28 November 1995) is an Indian cricketer who plays for Saurashtra. He made his first-class debut on 23 November 2015 in the 2015–16 Ranji Trophy.

References

External links
 

1995 births
Living people
Indian cricketers
Saurashtra cricketers
People from Rajkot